Aretades of Cnidus was an ancient Greek historian from the city of Cnidus. He wrote a work on the history of Macedon in three books at least, and another on the history of various Greek islands in two books at least. It is uncertain whether the particular Aretades referred to by Porphyry as the author of a work Peri Sumptoseos, is the same as Aretades of Cnidus or not.

References

Classical-era Greek historians